New Bhuj is a town in Kachchh District of Gujarat, India.

Transport 
It is served by a broad gauge branchline of the national railway network.

A metre gauge line used to go to Naliya.

See also 
 Railway stations in India

References 

Cities and towns in Kutch district